The Coca-Cola Classic Twelve Hours of Sebring, was the third round of the 1984 IMSA GT Championship and was held at the Sebring International Raceway, on March 24, 1984. Victory overall went to the No. 48 De Narvaez Enterprises Porsche 935 driven by Mauricio de Narvaez, Stefan Johansson, and Hans Heyer.

Race results
Class winners in bold.

Class Winners

References

12 Hours of Sebring
12 Hours of Sebring
12 Hours Of Sebring
12 Hours Of Sebring